Marrister is a settlement on the west coast of Whalsay in the parish of Nesting in the Shetland islands of Scotland. It looks across Linga Sound to the island of West Linga.

History
Marrister was occupied in Viking times and a gold Viking ring was unearthed there. In the 19th century and early 20th century it was associated with the Smith family. A large flat rock off Marrister is known as the Skate of Marrister. In the 1870s, Robert Cowie mentioned the "neat manse and still neater church" of Marrister, which had been recently built.

References

External links

Canmore - Whalsay, Marrister site record

Villages in Whalsay